Johan Norberg (born 27 August 1973) is a Swedish author and historian of ideas, devoted to promoting economic globalization and what he describes as classical liberal positions. He is arguably most known as the author of In Defense of Global Capitalism (2001) and Progress: Ten Reasons to Look Forward to the Future (2016). Since 15 March 2007 he has been a senior fellow at the Cato Institute, and since January 2017 an executive editor at Free To Choose Media, where he regularly produces documentaries for US public television.

Early life and education 

Johan Norberg was born in Stockholm, the son of former Swedish National Archivist Erik Norberg and his wife Birgitta. He grew up in the suburb of Hässelby in western Stockholm. In his youth, Norberg was active as a left-anarchist but later abandoned those views and became a classical liberal. According to the biography given at his personal website, Norberg was disillusioned with the anarchist view of liberty when he discovered the collectivist themes in the major anarchist works, and was unable to sympathize with the pre-industrial society which its anarcho-primitivism promoted. This realization made him embrace classical liberalism, which he felt "took freedom seriously." He studied at Stockholm University from 1992 to 1999 and earned a M.A. with a major in the history of ideas. His other subjects included philosophy, literature and political science. During his time at Stockholm University he was active in the libertarian network Frihetsfronten ("the Liberty Front") and was the editor of its journal Nyliberalen ("The Neoliberal"/"The Libertarian") from 1993 to 1997.

Career 

In 1997, Norberg was contacted by the Swedish liberal think tank Timbro, who invited him to write a book about the Swedish author Vilhelm Moberg. The book, Motståndsmannen Vilhelm Moberg, sold well and sparked much debate which allowed him to write another book, on the history of Swedish liberalism. This book, Den svenska liberalismens historia, also became a success and in 1999 Norberg joined the permanent staff of Timbro. From 1999 to 2002 he was assistant editor-in-chief of the webzine Smedjan.com. In 1999 he started the website Frihandel.nu to put forward the case for free trade and open economies.

Having participated in a number of debates against the Swedish anti-globalization movement, in May 2001 he released the book In Defense of Global Capitalism where he assembles his arguments for globalization and free trade. In 2002 the book was selected for the Sir Antony Fisher International Memorial Award by the Atlas Economic Research Foundation and in 2003 Norberg was awarded the gold medal of the German Hayek Stiftung (an award shared with former British Prime Minister Margaret Thatcher and the German economist Otmar Issing). The British Channel 4 also invited him to present the documentary film Globalisation is Good (released in 2003), which is based on his book.

From 2002 to 2005, Norberg was head of political ideas at Timbro. From 2006 to 2007 he was a Senior Fellow with the Brussels-based think tank Centre for the New Europe.

Since 15 March 2007 he has been a Senior Fellow at the Washington, D.C.-based Cato Institute. He is also a member of the international Mont Pelerin Society. In January 2017 Norberg became Executive Editor of Free To Choose Media.

In September 2020 he published the book Open: The Story of Human Progress, described by The Economist as "clear, colourful and convincing".

Personal life 

Norberg has two children.

Awards and honors 

 Sir Antony Fisher International Memorial Award from the Atlas Economic Research Foundation, for the book In Defense of Global Capitalism (2002).
 Prize of the Sture Lindmark Foundation for Public Debate, for opinion formation for free trade (May 2002).
 Gold medal of the Friedrich-August-von-Hayek-Stiftung, shared with former British Prime Minister Margaret Thatcher and ECB Chief Economist Otmar Issing (2003).
 Voted Sweden's best blogger by the readers of the magazine Internetworld (2005).
 Curt Nicolin Memorial Award from the Confederation of Swedish Enterprise (2006).
 James Joyce Award from the Literary and Historical Society of University College Dublin (2007)
 Luminary Award from the Free Market Foundation (2016)
 Julian L. Simon Memorial Award from the Competitive Enterprise Institute (2019)

Bibliography 

 
 
 
 
 
 
 
 
 
 
 
 
 
 
 
 
 
 Norberg, Johan (2020). Open: The Story of Human Progress. Atlantic Books. .

See also

 Corporate Welfare: Where’s the Outrage? – A Personal Exploration by Johan Norberg – Johan Norberg film 
 Sweden: Lessons for America? – Johan Norberg film 
 The Price of Peace – Johan Norberg film 
 Trailblazers: The New Zealand Story – Johan Norberg film 
 Work & Happiness: The Human Cost of Welfare – Johan Norberg film 
 Is America in Retreat? – Johan Norberg film 
 The Real Adam Smith Part 1: Morality and Markets – Johan Norberg film
 The Real Adam Smith Part 2: Ideas That Changed The World – Johan Norberg film 
 Power to the People – Johan Norberg film 
 India Awakes with Johan Norberg – Johan Norberg film 
 Economic Freedom in Action: Changing Lives – Johan Norberg featured 
 Europe's Debt: America's Crisis? – Johan Norberg film 
 Free or Equal – Johan Norberg film

References

External links 

 JohanNorberg.net – official website and blog
 Globalisation is Good – documentary film Globalisation is Good (2003)
 

1973 births
Living people
Articles containing video clips
Cato Institute people
Stockholm University alumni
Swedish bloggers
Swedish classical liberals
Swedish libertarians
Swedish political writers
Writers from Stockholm
Member of the Mont Pelerin Society